The Last Border is a 1993 Finnish post-apocalyptic film directed, written, and produced by Mika Kaurismäki, starring Jolyon Baker, Jürgen Prochnow, Fanny Bastien and Kari Väänänen. The film takes place in the near future for 2009, when pollution from the entire planet has forced people to move to the Arctic Circle, being the only viable territories.

The film was released at the 1993 Toronto International Film Festival.

Cast
 Jolyon Baker as Jake
 Jürgen Prochnow as Duke
 Fanny Bastien as Doaiva
 Kari Väänänen as Borka
 Matti Pellonpää as Dimitri
 Soli Labbart as Old woman
 Clas-Ove Bruun as Skunk
 Jussi Lampi as Rabbit
 Juice Leskinen as Bartender
 Esko Salminen as Jake's father
 Jochen Nickel as Beggar
 Mato Valtonen as Drunkard
 Sakke Järvenpää as Biker

Reception
Rotten Tomatoes gives The Last Border a score of 12% based on 60 ratings by audience.

In Variety magazine's October 1993 review, Emanuel Levy called film "a spoof of the Mad Max cult films." He comments, that films "subtle humor and moderate violence (by today's standards) may disappoint viewers expecting excessive treatment of such matters", but also said, that films "impressive visual design and strong perfs by Matti Pellonpää and Jürgen Prochnow could broaden satire's commercial prospects beyond the midnight circuit."

References

External links 
 
 

English-language Finnish films
1993 science fiction films
Finnish post-apocalyptic films
Films set in the future
Films set in Lapland
1993 films
Films directed by Mika Kaurismäki
Finnish science fiction films
Motorcycling films
Outlaw biker films
1990s English-language films